The 14th Pan American Games were held in Santo Domingo, Dominican Republic from August 1 to August 17, 2003.

Medals

Bronze

Women's Épée: Jesika Jiménez

Women's 50 m Freestyle: Eileen Coparropa

Results by event

Swimming

Men's Competition

Women's Competition

See also
Panama at the 2002 Central American and Caribbean Games
Panama at the 2004 Summer Olympics

References

Nations at the 2003 Pan American Games
P
2003